Big Ideas Learning, LLC is an educational publisher in the United States. The company's headquarters is located in Erie, Pennsylvania. It publishes mathematics textbooks and instructional technology materials.

Big Ideas Learning is a privately owned Limited liability company.

History

The origins of Big Ideas Learning go back to 1980, when mathematics textbook author Ron Larson started a small company called Larson Texts.  The company became incorporated in Pennsylvania in 1992 and became Larson Texts, Inc.

In 2008, the owners of Larson Texts formed a separate publishing company called Big Ideas Learning.  Big Ideas Learning develops and publishes mathematics textbooks.  The name of the company is related to the 2006 "Focal Point" recommendations of the National Council of Teachers of Mathematics.  In September 2006, NCTM released Curriculum Focal Points for Prekindergarten through Grade 8 Mathematics: A Quest for Coherence. In the Focal Points, NCTM identifies what it believes to be the most important mathematical topics ("the big ideas") for each grade level, including the related ideas, concepts, skills, and procedures that form the foundation for understanding and lasting learning.

In 2017 Big Ideas Learning announced a new partnership with National Geographic Learning (NGL), a Cengage company.  National Geographic Learning is the sole distributor of the Big Ideas Math programs.

Publications

The first publication for Big Ideas Learning was a series of middle school mathematics textbooks that implemented the NCTM's focal point curriculum. Each book had a national edition and a Florida edition, which was submitted for adoption in the state of Florida.  In the spring of 2010, Big Ideas Math was adopted by over half of Florida's 67 counties. The series won the 2010 Textbook Excellence Award ("Texty") for excellence in textbook publishing in the Elementary-High School Division for Mathematics.

In 2010, Big Ideas Learning published a series of middle school mathematics textbooks that implemented the Virginia Standards of Learning. In 2011, Big Ideas Learning published a series of middle school mathematics textbooks that implemented the Common Core State Standards. The series won the 2012 Textbook Excellence Award ("Texty") for excellence in textbook publishing in the Elementary-High School Division for Mathematics. In 2013, Big Ideas Math: A Common Core Curriculum Algebra 1 received the award for Most Promising Textbook from the Text and Academic Authors Association.

In 2014, Big Ideas Learning debuted the Big Ideas Math Algebra 1, Geometry, and Algebra 2 Common Core high school mathematics curriculum. The company also announced that it will be releasing the Big Ideas Math Course 1, Course 2, and Course 3 Common Core integrated high school mathematics curriculum in the spring of 2015.

Larson, Ron; Laurie Boswell (2010), Big Ideas Math Green, Big Ideas Learning
Larson, Ron; Laurie Boswell (2010), Big Ideas Math Red, Big Ideas Learning
Larson, Ron; Laurie Boswell (2010), Big Ideas Math Blue, Big Ideas Learning
Larson, Ron; Laurie Boswell (2010), Big Ideas Math 6 Florida Edition, Big Ideas Learning
Larson, Ron; Laurie Boswell (2010), Big Ideas Math 7 Florida Edition , Big Ideas Learning
Larson, Ron; Laurie Boswell (2010), Big Ideas Math 8 Florida Edition , Big Ideas Learning
Larson, Ron; Laurie Boswell (2012), Big Ideas Math 6 Virginia Edition, Big Ideas Learning
Larson, Ron; Laurie Boswell (2012), Big Ideas Math 7 Virginia Edition, Big Ideas Learning
Larson, Ron; Laurie Boswell (2012), Big Ideas Math 8 Virginia Edition, Big Ideas Learning
Larson, Ron; Laurie Boswell (2012), Big Ideas Math A Common Core Curriculum Green, Big Ideas Learning
Larson, Ron; Laurie Boswell (2012), Big Ideas Math A Common Core Curriculum Red, Big Ideas Learning
Larson, Ron; Laurie Boswell (2012), Big Ideas Math A Common Core Curriculum Blue, Big Ideas Learning
Larson, Ron; Laurie Boswell (2013), Big Ideas Math A Common Core Curriculum Red Accelerated, Big Ideas Learning
Larson, Ron; Laurie Boswell (2013), Big Ideas Math A Common Core Curriculum Algebra 1, Big Ideas Learning
Larson, Ron; Laurie Boswell (2014), Big Ideas Math 6 Georgia Edition, Big Ideas Learning
Larson, Ron; Laurie Boswell (2014), Big Ideas Math 7 Georgia Edition, Big Ideas Learning
Larson, Ron; Laurie Boswell (2014), Big Ideas Math 8 Georgia Edition, Big Ideas Learning
Larson, Ron; Laurie Boswell (2014), Big Ideas Math 7 Accelerated Georgia Edition, Big Ideas Learning
Larson, Ron; Laurie Boswell (2014), Big Ideas Math A Common Core Curriculum Green, Big Ideas Learning
Larson, Ron; Laurie Boswell (2014), Big Ideas Math A Common Core Curriculum Red, Big Ideas Learning
Larson, Ron; Laurie Boswell (2014), Big Ideas Math A Common Core Curriculum Blue, Big Ideas Learning
Larson, Ron; Laurie Boswell (2014), Big Ideas Math A Common Core Curriculum Algebra 1, Big Ideas Learning
Larson, Ron; Laurie Boswell (2014), Big Ideas Math A Common Core Curriculum Red Accelerated, Big Ideas Learning
Larson, Ron; Laurie Boswell (2014), Big Ideas Math A Common Core Curriculum Advanced 1, Big Ideas Learning
Larson, Ron; Laurie Boswell (2014), Big Ideas Math A Common Core Curriculum Advanced 2, Big Ideas Learning
Larson, Ron; Laurie Boswell (2015), Big Ideas Math Course 1 A Common Core Curriculum California Edition, Big Ideas Learning
Larson, Ron; Laurie Boswell (2015), Big Ideas Math Course 2 A Common Core Curriculum California Edition, Big Ideas Learning
Larson, Ron; Laurie Boswell (2015), Big Ideas Math Course 3 A Common Core Curriculum California Edition, Big Ideas Learning
Larson, Ron; Laurie Boswell (2015), Big Ideas Math Algebra 1 A Common Core Curriculum California Edition, Big Ideas Learning 
Larson, Ron; Laurie Boswell (2015), Big Ideas Math Course 2 Accelerated A Common Core Curriculum California Edition, Big Ideas Learning 
Larson, Ron; Laurie Boswell (2015), Big Ideas Math Advanced 1 A Common Core Curriculum California Edition, Big Ideas Learning 
Larson, Ron; Laurie Boswell (2015), Big Ideas Math Advanced 2 A Common Core Curriculum California Edition, Big Ideas Learning 
Larson, Ron; Laurie Boswell (2015), Big Ideas Math Course 1 A Common Core Curriculum Florida Edition, Big Ideas Learning
Larson, Ron; Laurie Boswell (2015), Big Ideas Math Course 2 A Common Core Curriculum Florida Edition, Big Ideas Learning
Larson, Ron; Laurie Boswell (2015), Big Ideas Math Prealgebra A Common Core Curriculum Florida Edition, Big Ideas Learning
Larson, Ron; Laurie Boswell (2015), Big Ideas Math Algebra 1 A Common Core Curriculum Florida Edition, Big Ideas Learning 
Larson, Ron; Laurie Boswell (2015), Big Ideas Math Advanced 1 A Common Core Curriculum Florida Edition, Big Ideas Learning 
Larson, Ron; Laurie Boswell (2015), Big Ideas Math Advanced 2 A Common Core Curriculum Florida Edition, Big Ideas Learning 
Larson, Ron; Laurie Boswell (2015), Big Ideas Math Algebra 1: A Common Core Curriculum, Big Ideas Learning
Larson, Ron; Laurie Boswell (2015), Big Ideas Math Geometry: A Common Core Curriculum , Big Ideas Learning
Larson, Ron; Laurie Boswell (2015), Big Ideas Math Algebra 2: A Common Core Curriculum , Big Ideas Learning
Larson, Ron; Laurie Boswell (2015), Big Ideas Math Algebra 1 Texas Edition, Big Ideas Learning
Larson, Ron; Laurie Boswell (2015), Big Ideas Math Geometry Texas Edition , Big Ideas Learning
Larson, Ron; Laurie Boswell (2015), Big Ideas Math Algebra 2 Texas Edition, Big Ideas Learning

Awards
Ron Larson, Text and Academic Authors Association Textbook Excellence Award, 2010, Big Ideas Math, 1st Edition, (Big Ideas Learning)
Ron Larson, Text and Academic Authors Association Textbook Excellence Award, 2012, Big Ideas Math: A Common Core Curriculum, 1st Edition, (Big Ideas Learning)
Ron Larson, Text and Academic Authors Association Most Promising New Textbook Award, 2013, Big Ideas Math: A Common Core Curriculum Algebra 1, 1st Edition (Big Ideas Learning)
Ron Larson, Text and Academic Authors Association Textbook Excellence Award, 2014, Big Ideas Math: A Common Core Curriculum, 7 Book Series, 2nd Edition, (Big Ideas Learning Learning)

References

Sources 

Ed-Pub Ohio "Ron Larson Introduces New Focal Points Curriculum" 
Florida Association of School Administrators 
Math and Literacy Intervention 
CAMT Online 
Ten County Mathematics Education Association 
Florida Department of State 
Utah State Office of Education 
Orlando Sentinel 
Florida Association of District Instructional Materials Administrators 
Florida Diagnostic and Learning Resources System 
The Steve Colgan Gallery 
2009-2010 Florida Short Bid Report 
Virginia Approved K-12 Mathematics Textbooks 
Alabama Recommendations for Adoption Mathematics 2011

External links 

 

Publishing companies established in 2008
Book publishing companies based in Pennsylvania
Educational publishing companies of the United States
Companies based in Erie, Pennsylvania